New Haven Arena was an indoor arena on Grove Street in New Haven, Connecticut, that served as a venue for ice hockey, concerts, and circuses.

The first arena opened in 1914 but burned down in 1924.  The new arena was started but went bankrupt; it was bought by Abraham Podoloff and his sons Nathan and Maurice and completed in 1927. It held over 4,000 people.

The Arena hosted the American Hockey League's New Haven Eagles from 1936 to 1952, the New Haven Blades of the Eastern Hockey League from 1954 to 1972, the New Haven Elms of the Eastern Professional Basketball League in 1965 and 1966, and Yale Hockey from 1914 to 1917 (at the first Arena) and from 1927 to 1959. The Rolling Stones, the Kinks, Bob Dylan, The Doors, Joan Baez, the Supremes, the Temptations, Cream and many music icons of the 1960s held concerts at the Arena.

Perhaps one of the most famous incidents in the Arena's history occurred on December 9, 1967 when Jim Morrison, front man for the rock group The Doors, was arrested on stage during a performance, making him the first rock star to be taken into custody during a performance. The arrest was the inspiration for the Doors song "Peace Frog" which was released in 1970.

When the New Haven Coliseum was completed in 1972, most of the Arena's business went there. The Arena was demolished in 1974. The site is now the headquarters of the New Haven Division of the FBI.

See also
 Professional ice hockey in Connecticut, for a discussion of ice hockey teams that played in the venue
 New Haven Coliseum, the venue that replaced the New Haven Arena

External links
 Photo of New Haven Arena and Arena Grill Restaurant, corner of Grove & Orange Streets, New Haven, Connecticut.
 New Haven Arena photo, Connecticut History Online.
 Photo of New Haven Arena, State St. side, Connecticut History Online.
 Facebook Fan page of the New Haven Arena.

References

Indoor ice hockey venues in the United States
Arena
Defunct indoor arenas in Connecticut